Gringo (masculine) (or gringa (feminine)) is a term in Spanish and Portuguese for a foreigner, usually an English-speaking Anglo-American. There are differences in meaning depending on region and country. In Latin America, it is generally used to refer to non-Latin Americans. The term is often considered a pejorative in English, and in the United States its usage and offensiveness is disputed.

The word derives from the term used by the Spanish for a Greek person: griego. According to the Oxford English Dictionary, the first recorded use in English comes from John Woodhouse Audubon's Western Journal of 1849–1850, in which Audubon reports that his party was hooted and shouted at and called "Gringoes" while passing through the town of Cerro Gordo, Veracruz.

Etymology
The word gringo originally referred to any kind of foreigner. It was first recorded in 1787 in the Spanish Diccionario castellano con las voces de Ciencias y Artes:

The most likely theory is that it originates from griego ('Greek'), used in the same way as the English phrase "it's Greek to me". Spanish is known to have used Greek as a stand-in for incomprehensibility, though now less common, such as in the phrase hablar en griego (lit. 'to speak Greek'). The 1817 Nuevo diccionario francés-español, for example, gives gringo and griego as synonyms in this context:

This derivation requires two steps: griego > grigo, and grigo > gringo. Corominas notes that while the first change is common in Spanish (e.g. priesa to prisa), there is no perfect analogy for the second, save in Old French (Gregoire to Grigoire to Gringoire). However, there are other Spanish words whose colloquial form contains an epenthetic n, such as gordiflón and gordinflón ('chubby'), and Cochinchina and Conchinchina ('South Vietnam'). It is also possible that the final form was influenced by the word jeringonza, a game like Pig Latin also used to mean "gibberish".

Alternatively, it has been suggested that gringo could derive from the Caló language, the language of the Romani people of Spain, as a variant of the hypothetical *peregringo, 'peregrine', 'wayfarer', 'stranger'.

Folk etymologies
There are several folk etymologies that purport to derive the origin of gringo from word coincidences. Many of these folk etymologies date the word to the Mexican–American War (1846–1848):

 Gringo is a result of American troops singing songs which began with "Green grows..." such as "Green Grow the Rushes, O", "Green Grow the Lilacs", and various others. 
 Another theory involves locals yelling "Green, go home!" at invading American soldiers (sometimes in conflicts other than the Mexican–American War), in reference to their supposedly green uniforms. 
 Another derives from the Irish "Erin go bragh" ("Ireland forever"), which served as the motto for Saint Patrick's Battalion who fought alongside the Mexican army.

Regional usage

Argentina
The word gringo is mostly used in rural areas following the original Spanish meaning. Gringo in Argentina was used to refer to non-Spanish European immigrants who first established agricultural colonies in the country. The word was used for Swiss, German, Polish, Italian and other immigrants, but since the Italian immigrants were the larger group, the word primarily referred to Italians in the lunfardo argot. It also found use in the intermittent exercise Gringo-Gaucho between Argentine Naval Aviation and US Navy aircraft carriers. More recently, young people may use gringo to refer to US citizens.

Brazil
In Brazil, the word gringo means "foreigner" and has no connection to physical characteristics or specific countries. For example, foreign football players in the Brazilian Championship that come from other Latin American countries are referred to as "gringos" by the sports media and by sports fans. Tourists are called gringos regardless of their ethnic origins (i.e. Latin Americans or people from other regions, like Europe).

As the word has no connection to physical appearance in Brazil, black African or African American foreigners are also called gringos. Popularly used terms for fair-skinned and blond people are generally based in specific nationalities, like "alemão" (i.e., German), "russo" (Russian) or, in some regions, "galego" (Galician) which are used for both Brazilians and foreigners with such characteristics, regardless of national or ethnic origins.

Mexico 

In Mexico, the use of the word "gringo" has been reserved for people from the U.S., especially Anglo Americans, since the end of the 19th century.

The term is mentioned in its meaning of "incomprehensible language" from the 18th century (1789) to the 1830s, but also to indicate foreign troops, at first, coming from Spain in the second half of the 18th century. A text published in Mexico, but written by a Spaniard, denigrates a Mexican from Sonora for speaking "gringo", in reference to the indigenous language. After the Mexican-American War, gringo began to be used for citizens from that country, with expressions such as "American gringo" or simply gringo, attested as in popular use in Tepetitlán in 1849. Since then, gringo became a way to designate United States citizens exclusively.

United States 
In the United States, gringo is often used by Latino Americans to refer to Anglo Americans. It is considered to be a racial slur targeted towards non-Hispanic white people but it may also refer to any person that is not Latino. Among the US Latino communities it may also disparagingly refer to another Latino person perceived to not be culturally Latino, e.g. inability to speak Spanish.

Other regions 
In Bolivia, Honduras, Nicaragua and Peru, the term is used for referring to blonde people.

Other uses

Food 
In Mexican cuisine, a gringa is a flour tortilla with al pastor pork meat with cheese, heated on a comal and optionally served with a salsa de chile (chilli sauce). Some attribute the name to the white flour used.

Activism
In 1969, José Ángel Gutiérrez, one of the leaders of the Mexican American Youth Organization, said his and MAYO's use of the term, rather than referring to non-Latinos, referred to people or institutions with policies or attitudes that reflect racism and violence.

See also
 Anglo – used as a synonym for non-Latino whites in the United States
 List of ethnic slurs

Notes

References

1780s neologisms
Anti-Americanism
Pejorative terms for in-group non-members
Mexican slang
Mexican Spanish
Mexican-American history
Spanish words and phrases
Portuguese words and phrases
Social rejection